Lanzarote is the easternmost of the autonomous Canary Islands.

Lanzarote may also refer to:
 Lanzarote (DO), a Spanish Denominación de Origen for wines
 Lanzarote (novel), a novel by Michel Houellebecq
 Lanzarote (horse), a well-known National Hunt racehorse.

See also
 392225 Lanzarote, asteroid named after the Canary Island
 Lanzarote Airport, an airport on Lanzarote
 Lanzarote Hurdle, a National Hunt hurdle race run at Kempton Park Racecourse
 UD Lanzarote, a Spanish football team based in Arrecife